Coleophora mcdunnoughiella is a moth of the family Coleophoridae. It is found in Canada, including Nova Scotia.

References

mcdunnoughiella
Moths described in 1971
Moths of North America